Once Upon a Time is the fifth studio album by the British band Dreadzone. It was released in 2005 on Functional Records.

Track listing
All tracks composed by Greg Roberts, Steve Roberts and Ben Balafonic; except where indicated
"First Steps (Intro)" - 0:57
"King Dub Rock" - 5:28
"Once Upon a Time (In Jamaica)" (Earl Daley, Spencer Graham) - 5:31
"Iron Shirt" (Lee Perry, Max Romeo) - 5:02
"Ska Con Queso" - 7:04
"Elevate" (Spencer Graham) - 5:15
"Games People Play" (Joe South) - 5:10
"I Know" (Spencer Graham) - 5:06
"Here We Go" (Spencer Graham) - 4:15
"The Warriors" - 6:21
"Dancehall Priority" (Earl Daley, Juksy D) - 5:44
"First Steps"- 7:08

Personnel
Greg Roberts
Steve Roberts
Ben Balafonic
Earl Sixteen
MC Spee (Spencer Graham)

2005 albums
Dreadzone albums